Whistling in the Dark may refer to:

Books
Whistling in the Dark: a doubter's dictionary, a 1988 book by Frederick Buechner
 Whistling in the Dark: True Stories and Other Fables, a 1992 book by George Garrett
 Whistling in the Dark: In Pursuit of the Nightingale, a 1993 book by Richard Mabey

Film and theatre
 Whistling in the Dark (1933 film), a comedy crime film adapted from a Broadway play of the same title 
Whistling in the Dark (1932 play) starring Ernest Truex
 Whistling in the Dark (1941 film), another adaptation of the play, starring Red Skelton 

Music
 Whistling in the Dark (album), a 1979 album by Max Gronenthal, also known as Max Carl
 Whistling in The Dark, a 2008 album by Hank Wangford & The Lost Cowboys
 Whistling in the Dark, a 2006 album by Terry Garland
 "Whistling in the Dark", a song by Easterhouse
 "Whistling in the Dark", a song by They Might Be Giants from Flood